The term chess prodigy refers to a young child who possesses an aptitude for the game of chess that far exceeds what might be expected at their age. Their prodigious talent will often enable them to defeat experienced adult players and even titled chess masters. Some chess prodigies have progressed to become World Chess Champions.

Early chess prodigies
Early chess prodigies included Paul Morphy (1837–1884) and José Raúl Capablanca (1888–1942), both of whom won matches against strong adult opponents at the age of 12, and Samuel Reshevsky (1911–1992), who was giving simultaneous exhibitions at the age of six. Morphy went on to become the world's leading player before the formal title of World Champion existed. Capablanca became the third World Champion, and Reshevsky—while never attaining the title—was amongst the world's elite players for many decades.

Arturo Pomar (1931–2016) was another to be labelled a prodigy by chess writers. He played his first international tournament (Madrid 1943) at the age of 11 and went on to become Spain's first grandmaster.

Youngest to defeat a grandmaster 
There is often widespread attention when a young player defeats a Grandmaster, whether in a standard tournament game or less formal conditions.

Formal conditions
The youngest player to defeat a grandmaster under standard time controls is Awonder Liang, who in 2012 defeated Larry Kaufman at the Washington International at the age of 9 years and 111 days.

The previous record was set in 2009, when Hetul Shah defeated GM Nurlan Ibrayev at the age of nine years and six months at the Parsvnath Open.

Informal conditions

In 1999, David Howell defeated John Nunn in a blitz game at the age of eight.

In 1976, a ten-year-old Nigel Short beat Viktor Korchnoi as a participant in a simultaneous exhibition, the only game Korchnoi lost in the event.

In March 2021, 10-year-old Frederick Waldhausen Gordon, from Scotland, won against GM Bogdan Lalic in an online rapid 10+5 game in the ECF Grand Prix Rapid Event 1 held on lichess.org.

In August 2020, 9-year-old Tanitoluwa Adewumi, a Nigerian refugee living in the US, defeated GM Hikaru Nakamura in a blitz game on chess.com.

List of youngest grandmasters

Since 1950, when the Grandmaster (GM) title was introduced by FIDE, one measure of chess prodigies is the age at which they gain the GM title. Below are players who have held the record for the youngest grandmaster. The record is currently held by Abhimanyu Mishra. The age listed is the age at which they qualified for the title. This is not equal to the age at which they officially became grandmasters, because GM titles can only be awarded at FIDE congresses. The nationality listed is the player's nationality at the time of gaining the title, not their current or later nationality.

This is a list of the players who became Grandmasters before their 14th birthday.

Note: Karjakin and Rapport have changed countries since attaining the grandmaster title.

List of youngest female grandmasters
Below are the holders of the record for the youngest female player to become a grandmaster (not to be confused with the lesser Woman Grandmaster title):

References

External links 

 Chessbase news about young Grandmasters
 Youngest Chess Player in India Set World Record
 Smallest Chess Player Chess Tournament Set World Record

prodigy
Giftedness
Childhood
Intelligence